HLR may refer to:

 Hall Road railway station, in England, National Rail station code
 Heli Air Services, Bulgaria, ICAO code
 Home location register, a GSM subscriber database
 Hong Lok Road stop, Hong Kong, MTR station code
 Hood Army Airfield, in Texas, US, ICO and FAA LID code
The Human Life Review, an anti-abortion publication.
 Human Lunar Return study